Sebastián Fernando Depolo Cabrera (born 10 November 1976) is a Chilean politician. 

In 2022, he was sent by the presidency of Gabriel Boric as ambassador of Chile to Brazil.

References

External links
 

1976 births
Living people
Democratic Revolution politicians
21st-century Chilean politicians
University of Concepción alumni